The  are a small uninhabited Japanese island group in the East China Sea situated approximately  south-southwest of the Gotō Islands and administratively part of the city of Gotō, Nagasaki Prefecture. The islands, their flora, and their fauna are protected as a Natural Monument, Biotic Community Protection Forest, Special Wildlife Protection Area,  and Important Bird Area. Birds found on the islands include the Japanese murrelet, streaked shearwater, brown booby, Ryukyu robin, Japanese wood pigeon, and Pleske's grasshopper warbler.

Maps and images

See also

 Fukue Island
 Jeju Island

References

Gotō, Nagasaki
Islands of Nagasaki Prefecture
Archipelagoes of Japan
Islands of the East China Sea
Natural monuments of Japan
Important Bird Areas of Japan